Risk is a comic book character appearing in publications from DC Comics, first appearing in Teen Titans (vol. 2), #1 (October 1996).

Fictional character biography

Origins
Raised in the Colorado community of Cosmos, Cody Driscoll has lived alone with his mother in one of the worst trailer parks. His father died when he was just six months old. His mother has had two husbands since, so it hasn't been easy for Cody.

Cody, although an above-average student, was always a bit of a thrill junkie and troublemaker. He made a hobby out of rebelling against authority. It was during one such stunt, sneaking into the government facility known as NORAD, that Cody was suddenly teleported away.

Isiah Crockett (Joto), Toni Monetti (Argent) and Cody were all abducted by the alien race, H'San Natall. Just before Crockett was abducted, The Atom was caught in the energy stream and was transported as well. Once on the alien ship, they meet and rescue another Earth girl (Prysm) who was raised in a virtual reality environment that mimics life on Earth (based on old TV shows from the 1950s). The group of teenagers was able to escape the aliens and return to Earth.

Titans

During the adventure, the teens learned that they were half-alien, and their mothers were impregnated by the H'San Natall. They discover they were all born on June 21. Apparently, the kids were part of a sleeper agent program by the H'San Natall to defeat the super-powered beings already on Earth. The group stayed together, and with the funding of Loren Jupiter, became the latest incarnation of the Teen Titans. Atom decided to remain on the team to learn how to readjust to his life as a teenager.

Teammate Prysm developed a crush on Cody, although he seemed more interested in pursuing Argent at the time.

After a battle with Haze (Jarrod Jupiter), teammate Joto seemingly died, leaving the team devastated. The group almost broke up after Joto's 'death', and Argent was instrumental in initiating a membership drive to keep the group together. The team stayed together for a time with new members Fringe and Captain Marvel, Jr. joining as well.

After another altercation with the H'San Natall and The Veil, the team discovered that Joto was actually alive. They rescued him, but Prysm and Fringe elected to remain in space. As Risk said goodbye to Prysm, he told her he loved her. The rest of the team decided to go their separate ways and disbanded. Risk returned to Colorado to resume living with his mother.

Risk aided the Titans again during the Technis Imperative conflict, which involved the Justice League as well as all Titans, past and present. The two teams were of seemingly opposing sides concerning the fate of the Titans member Cyborg, whose actions were threatening the entire Earth. Risk himself jumpstarted a brutal fight between the teams when he attacks by himself and is struck down hard by Orion. The two teams eventually work together to save the earth and Cyborg.

Infinite Crisis

After that time, Risk embarked on a career of petty crime, becoming a fugitive. Later, however, he seemed to return to more heroic ways. In Infinite Crisis #4, Kon-El called in all the reserve Titans to help him battle Superboy-Prime. When the other Titans attacked him, Superboy-Prime lashed back; not aware of the full extent of his powers, he ended up brutally maiming and murdering several of the Titans (including killing Pantha and Wildebeest). Risk was one of his victims, as Superboy-Prime ripped off his right arm during the battle. In Teen Titans (vol. 3) #32, it was shown that Argent used her plasma energy to stop the blood flowing from his shoulder, saving his life.

Titans East

One Year Later, Risk is a member of the group Titans East. In an interview, writer Geoff Johns stated that "you're going to meet him in the next issue and see where he is in his life. He's still missing an arm. And his attitude is like, at one point someone's going to say, 'Why don't you get a cybernetic arm?' And he says, 'I only need one arm'. That's his attitude. He's just kind of gruff and at the end of his rope". 

He has, in fact, resurfaced in where he's shown living a life of petty crimes in Colorado, for the thrill of it, apparently addicted to painkillers. Returning to his dirty camper in a bidonville, he is approached and blackmailed by Deathstroke into joining Titans East.

Cody and Batgirl break into Bombshell's prison cell and kill her for not upholding her bargain with Deathstroke (Bombshell is later seen alive). Risk then captures Cyborg, rips off his arms and legs and punches him repeatedly. He continues to do so until Raven forces him to relive the pain of his arm being ripped off, at which point she and Duela Dent free Cyborg and escape to get help from Nightwing and his old group of Titans. Risk recovers from Raven's attack and defeats Robin and Batgirl (who was freed from Deathstroke's mind control) before Nightwing and his team arrive. He, along with a majority of the Titans East, are defeated.

The Sinestro Corps War

In Tales of the Sinestro Corps: Superman-Prime, Risk returns in the battle of Earth's heroes against Superman-Prime in revenge for pulling off his right arm during Infinite Crisis, but Prime then tears Risk's left arm off as well.

Death
Risk is assassinated in Nightwing (vol. 4) #89 (2022), a crossover with Superman: Son of Kal-El as part of super-hero killings. After boasting about his invulnerability, he is promptly drowned in Metropolis Harbor by someone on behalf of The Rising, a project of military scientist, Henry Bendix.

Powers and abilities
Risk is stronger and faster than the average human, and his senses are more acute. His strength, speed and senses are said to be multiplied about six times the average human and up to ten times on occasions. He has been observed punching through solid rock, tearing down concrete pillars, destroying a large robot in one kick and punching Superboy through a building and large piece of construction equipment with one blow. The adrenaline rushing through his body makes him take a greater risk each time.

References

DC Comics characters with superhuman strength
DC Comics superheroes
DC Comics supervillains
Fictional amputees
Fictional characters from Colorado
Comics characters introduced in 1996
DC Comics characters who can move at superhuman speeds
DC Comics characters with superhuman senses
DC Comics hybrids
Characters created by Dan Jurgens
Fictional extraterrestrial–human hybrids in comics